The name No. 68 Squadron has been used for two quite different units, only one of which was strictly a unit of the Royal Air Force. "No. 68 Squadron RFC" was for a time the official British military designation for No. 2 Squadron Australian Flying Corps.

World War I

No. 2 Squadron, Australian Flying Corps was formed at Heliopolis, Egypt in 1916. For a while it was known to the British military as "No. 68 Squadron RFC" - according to some accounts in order to avoid confusion with No. 2 Squadron, RFC. This designation was never accepted by the squadron or the Australian Imperial Force, and was in fact officially dropped by the British by early 1918, before the formation of the RAF.

Initially equipped with Airco DH.5 aircraft, the unit's main role with these aircraft was the strafing of hostile trenches. In January 1918 the unit was re-equipped with S.E.5a fighters, which it retained for the rest of the war. The squadron claimed 77 enemy aircraft destroyed. It remained in Europe until 28 February 1919 when it was disbanded.

World War II
During World War II, a new No. 68 squadron (the first RAF squadron to actually bear the number) was formed at RAF Catterick on 7 January 1941 as a night fighter squadron equipped with Bristol Blenheims and became operational on 7 April before moving to High Ercall. In May 1941 No. 68 converted to Bristol Beaufighters and in March 1942 it moved to RAF Coltishall in Norfolk. In July 1944 the Squadron converted to de Havilland Mosquitoes.

From July 1941 No. 68 Squadron always had a strong element of Czechoslovak airmen in exile, with up to eight flying crews consisting entirely of Czechoslovak personnel. One flight of the squadron was Czechoslovak. Notable pilots included flying ace Miloslav Mansfeld, who as a Beaufighter pilot shot down numerous Luftwaffe bombers and as a Mosquito pilot shot down two V-1 flying bombs. From October 1943 Mansfeld commanded the squadron's "A" flight.

The poet James Farrar was a Pilot Officer of 68 Squadron. He was killed on the night of 25/26 July 1944 when, on patrol over the Thames (as navigator of a Mosquito piloted by Fred Kemp), he was ordered to intercept a V1 flying bomb.

Both the Czechoslovak element and the squadron's night fighter service were honoured in 1944 when Air Chief Marshal Charles Steele presented a badge to the squadron that shows an owl's head and has the Czech motto Vždy připraven – "Always prepared" or "Always ready".

No. 68 Squadron was deactivated on 20 April 1945 with the personnel joining various other units including No. 125 Squadron RAF.

1950s
On 1 January 1952 the squadron was re-formed as a night-fighter unit at RAF Wahn in West Germany. It flew Gloster Meteors until renumbered as No. 5 Squadron RAF on 20 January 1959.

See also
List of Royal Air Force aircraft squadrons

References

Notes

Works cited

External links

068 Squadron
Fighter squadrons of the Royal Air Force in World War II
Military units and formations disestablished in 1959